Lorena Beatriz Alonso Ortiz (born 1 April 1998) is a Paraguayan footballer who plays as a defender for Club Sol de América and the Paraguay women's national team.

International career
Alonso represented Paraguay at the 2014 FIFA U-17 Women's World Cup and the 2018 FIFA U-20 Women's World Cup. She made her senior debut on 9 August 2019 against Costa Rica in the 2019 Pan American Games.

References

External links

1998 births
Living people
Women's association football defenders
Women's association football midfielders
Paraguayan women's footballers
Paraguay women's international footballers
Pan American Games competitors for Paraguay
Footballers at the 2019 Pan American Games
Club Sol de América footballers
20th-century Paraguayan women
21st-century Paraguayan women